Kiril Akalski (born 17 October 1985) is a Bulgarian footballer who plays as a goalkeeper for Oborishte Panagyurishte.

Career

Maritsa Plovdiv
Born in Plovdiv his first club was local Maritsa. Akalski started his professional football career at the second division team in the 2005–06 season.

Lokomotiv Plovdiv
He then transferred to Lokomotiv Plovdiv in the winter of 2008, as this gave him the opportunity to play in the top division. Akalski signed a two-a-half years deal with the club in January 2008. He has been given the No.12 shirt.

On 31 October 2009, he was involved in a serious on-pitch brawl, following his team's 0–1 defeat to Botev Plovdiv.

Levski Sofia
On 14 August 2010 it was announced that Kiril Akalski is came to an agreement with Levski Sofia. On 20 August 2010 Akalski officially signed his contract with Levski. The contract is for 3 years. Akalski chose to play with kit number 85.

Akalski made his unofficial debut for Levski on 4 September 2010 in a friendly match against Montana. He entered the match as a substitute for the final 3–1 win for Levski.

Return to Maritsa
In January 2018, Akalski joined his hometown club Maritsa Plovdiv. He left the club at the end of the 2017–18 season following the relegation to Third League.

Oborishte
On 10 July 2018, Akalski signed with Third League club Oborishte.

Career Stats
Updated 9 January 2011.

References

External links
 Profile at LevskiSofia.info 

1985 births
Living people
Footballers from Plovdiv
Bulgarian footballers
First Professional Football League (Bulgaria) players
Second Professional Football League (Bulgaria) players
Association football goalkeepers
FC Maritsa Plovdiv players
PFC Lokomotiv Plovdiv players
PFC Levski Sofia players
PFC Beroe Stara Zagora players
PFC Cherno More Varna players
FC Haskovo players
SFC Etar Veliko Tarnovo players
FC Oborishte players
Bulgarian expatriate footballers
Bulgarian expatriate sportspeople in Germany
Expatriate footballers in Germany